The Men's 10,000m T12 had its Final held on September 14 at 18:53.

Medalists

Results

References
Final

Athletics at the 2008 Summer Paralympics